Veronica "Ronni" Jane Ancona (born 4 July 1966) is a British actress, comedian, impressionist and writer best known for The Big Impression, which she co-wrote and starred in and was, for four years, one of BBC One's top-rated comedy programmes, winning numerous awards, including a BAFTA in 2003. Ancona also starred in the first series of the BAFTA-winning ITV series The Sketch Show. Ancona has appeared in the BAFTA-winning Last Tango in Halifax since its creation in 2012. She is a co-director, alongside Sally Phillips and Nick Hamson, of the production company Captain Dolly.

Early life 
Ancona was born in Louth, Lincolnshire, but moved to Scotland when she was a few days old and was  brought up in Troon. She is of Italian Jewish descent. Her father was a commander in the Royal Navy and her mother was an artist who painted the sets at the Gaiety Theatre in Ayr and the Theatre Royal in Glasgow. Ancona is the youngest of three children, with two older brothers. In the BBC television programme Comedy Map of Britain she returned to her old school, Marr College in Troon, and talked about her earliest comedy performing experience as part of an improvisation group called Pots People.

She attended the University of Kent at Canterbury to study film and then did a degree in theatre & TV design at Saint Martin's School of Art. At the age of 19, while she was studying at St Martin's College, the BBC's Blue Peter reported on a play about Brecht at the Riverside Studios in which she was involved as a designer and performer: her appearance was later covered on the BBC show Before They Were Famous. Ancona then attended the Institute of Education, University College London and qualified as a teacher in art, design & technology, and drama. Whilst working as a teacher, Ancona started a comedy career on the live circuit. She won the Time Out Hackney Empire New Act of the Year in 1993.

Television career

For many years Ancona worked extensively in radio and on television shows such as Fist of Fun, as well as performing stand-up comedy. She co-wrote and performed in shows such as Comedy Nation, Pulp Video, and The Sketch Show alongside Lee Mack. In 2000 she teamed up with Alistair McGowan, with whom she had previously worked on The Staggering Stories of Ferdinand De Bargos and Standing Room Only, to create The Big Impression. The show was one of BBC1's top-rating comedy programmes for four years, and won both a Variety Club Comedy Award and a BAFTA. In 2003 she won "Best Actress" at the British Comedy Awards.

In 2003 she starred in the BBC One historical drama The Key.

In 2005 she played Barbara in Stephen Poliakoff's Gideon's Daughter on BBC One.

She has appeared several times on the BBC celebrity panel show QI. In November 2006 she was a guest presenter on Have I Got News For You. She also appeared on the Channel 4 comedy show TV Heaven, Telly Hell discussing her preferences in television shows.

In 2007 her three-episode comedy sketch series Ronni Ancona & Co was broadcast on BBC One.

She appeared as the mother of Katie and Emily Fitch in the third (2009) and fourth (2010) series of Skins.

In 2009 she had a leading role in the BBC comedy drama Hope Springs.

As part of BBC's The Big Read she promoted The Lion, the Witch and the Wardrobe.

In April 2010, she appeared on A Comedy Roast, celebrating Sharon Osbourne's life. She appeared on the 2010 Strictly Come Dancing Christmas Special where she was paired with Anton Du Beke.

Ancona also took part in Comic Relief’s Desert Trek 2011 alongside Craig David, Olly Murs, Dermot O’Leary, Scott Mills and Lorraine Kelly.

In 2012 she appeared in Last Tango in Halifax.

In January 2015 she was a guest on Room 101.

In 2016 she played the role of Mrs Fletcher, the manager of a local care home, in the seventh series of the Scottish comedy Still Game. Later that year she made a guest appearance in an episode of the BBC television series Celebrity Antiques Road Trip, partnering with antiques expert James Braxton.

In April 2017 Ancona appeared as a guest on ITV's The Nightly Show, presented by Jason Manford, in which they each performed impersonations of famous people which the other had to identify.

On 27 December 2020, Ancona appeared as a contestant on the Christmas special of Who Wants to Be a Millionaire? Celebrity Special.

She won Pointless Celebrities in January 2021 with Jan Ravens.

Film career 
Ancona’s first feature role was in 1996 when she appeared in The Debt Collector alongside Billy Connolly.

In 2004, she played the role of Pat Connelly in The Calcium Kid.

In the same year she appeared in Stella Street: The Movie, playing numerous female celebrities including Madonna and Victoria Beckham.

In 2005, Ancona played the role of Anita in Michael Winterbottom's A Cock and Bull Story.

She had a cameo role in the 2006 fantasy romantic comedy Penelope.

In 2013, Ancona was cast as Mrs Spencer in The Devil Went Down to Islington, a horror film following two hapless Londoners who sell their souls to Satan.

She played Donna, Rob Brydon's agent, in the 2014 film The Trip to Italy.

In 2018, she had a small role in the US comedy film Show Dogs. and starred in Surviving Christmas with the Relatives.

Theatre 
Ancona's first Edinburgh Festival appearance was in 1992, during which she performed in two shows: The Inexplicable World of Lionel Nimrod with Stewart Lee and Richard Herring, and a stand-up show with Alistair McGowan.

Her first theatre role was in Miss Conceptions in 1996, a comedy play she co-wrote with Alan Francis, directed by Anthony Nielson.

In 2004 Ancona was cast in Singin' in the Rain, the first production with Adam Cooper. Ancona played the role of Lina Lamont, the silent-movie starlet, in the Sadler's Wells production.

She then played the gold-digging temptress Belline in Richard Bean's 2005 production of Molière's The Hypochondriac, alongside Carey Mulligan and Henry Goodman. The play received favourable reviews, with Michael Billington for The Guardian giving it four stars out of five and describing it as a "hilarious new version".

Ancona returned to the Almeida to perform in Little Revolution, set during and after the 2011 London riots, alongside Lucian Msamati and Imogen Stubbs.

In June 2015 Ancona was cast to play the role of Paula in the musical adaptation of Bend It Like Beckham at the West End's Phoenix Theatre. However, she had to pull out of the play for personal reasons before the premier. Later that year she appeared alongside Justin Fletcher in The Tale of Mr Tumble  during the Manchester International Festival.

In 2019 she performed in the Edinburgh Fringe show Just Checking In, which she co-wrote with  Kim Fuller and fellow cast member Lewis MacLeod.

Written work
In 2009 A Matter of Life and Death: How to Wean a Man Off Football, by Ancona and Alistair McGowan, was published by Faber & Faber.

Awards

Ancona co-wrote The Big Impression, which won numerous awards including a BAFTA in 2003. She was nominated for Best Comedy Newcomer in 2000 and Best Comedy actress in 2002, as well as winning The Best TV comedy Actress in 2003. Ancona and McGowan also received The Variety Club Comedy Award in 2002.

Nominee - Best Comedy Newcomer - Big Impression - 2000

Winner - Broadcast Award - 2001

Nominee – Best Comedy Actress - 2002 - Big Impression

Winner - Variety Club Comedy Award - 2002

Winner - New TV Talent of the Year - Television and Radio Industries Club - 2002

Winner - Comedy Actress - Maxim Women of the Year Awards – 2002

Winner - Best TV Comedy Actress - Big Impression - 2003

Winner - Funny Woman of the Year - Glamour Women of the Year Awards - 2004

Winner - BAFTA – The Sketch Show

Winner - BAFTA – The Big Impression

Personal life 

Ancona had a seven-year relationship with Alistair McGowan which ended shortly before they started working together professionally.  Ancona is married to Gerard Hall, a consultant rheumatologist with whom she has two daughters. They live in West London.

Ancona is an ambassador to the Environmental Investigation Agency, Marie Curie and Sightsavers.

Appearances

Television

Film

Short Film

Radio

Theatre

Writer

Producer

References

External links 
 
 
 

1966 births
Living people
Scottish impressionists (entertainers)
Scottish film actresses
Scottish radio actresses
Scottish stage actresses
Scottish television actresses
People from Louth, Lincolnshire
People from Troon
Scottish Jews
Scottish people of English descent
Scottish people of Italian descent
British people of Italian-Jewish descent
British Sephardi Jews
People educated at Marr College
20th-century Scottish actresses
21st-century Scottish actresses
20th-century Scottish comedians
21st-century Scottish comedians
Scottish people of Jewish descent
Alumni of Saint Martin's School of Art
Scottish women comedians